The Renault 25 is an executive car produced by the French automaker Renault from 1983 to 1992. 

The 25 was Renault's flagship, the most expensive, prestigious, and the largest vehicle in the company's line up. It placed second in the 1985 European Car of the Year rankings. In total, 780,976 units were built from 1983 until 1992.

All 25s were built in Sandouville, near Le Havre, France.

Introduction 

Introduced at the end of 1983 for a March 1984 start of sales, the Renault 25 was a large step forward in nearly every aspect from the Renault 20 / Renault 30 range it was replacing. Its five-door liftback body was penned by designers Gaston Juchet and Robert Opron of Citroën SM fame, and the unconventional style (the wraparound rear window - one of Opron's signature design features was used on many of his earlier designs such as the SM, the Renault Fuego and Renault 11) was aimed at giving the car a notchback look in order to overcome customer preference outside France for formal sedans in the segment.

The 25 was one of the first cars designed from the start for aerodynamic efficiency giving a drag coefficient (Cd) of 0.31, a key factor in improving fuel economy. The TS model briefly held the unofficial title of "world's most aerodynamic mass production car" with a Cd of 0.28, and at its launch, the 25 was easily the best in its class for fuel economy.

All Renault 25 models were front-wheel drive, with four-cylinder (2 and 2.2 L petrol injection or 2.1 L diesel) and six-cylinder (2849 cc and 2458 cc turbo injection) engines mounted longitudinally forward of the front axle. The 25's performance was above average for its class, at least in the V6 Turbo specification. A turbodiesel version of the J8S engine was also available.

The 25 was praised for its ride comfort and spirited handling (despite slight understeer, and torque steer on V6 Turbo models). A newly designed manual transmission drew unanimous praise for its precision and smoothness (although the detent spring on fifth gear could cause misselection of third gear). The futuristic interior was executed by Italian designer Marcello Gandini (of Lamborghini fame) and was somewhat controversial, but the 25's passenger compartment was considered quiet, spacious, and well lit.

Equipment levels were high and set new standards for French cars, the 25 including among other features, an express up and down feature on the driver's power window, voice alerts (covering items such as improperly shut doors/bonnet/boot – oil pressure, engine temperature/charging circuit and blown bulbs), and one of the world's first remote stereo controls, mounted to the right of the steering column (controlling volume +/–, station search, station select (jog wheel) in radio mode with volume +/–, mute and track advance (if supported)). For the first time since World War II, Renault had an entry in the full-size market segment outside France.

Automatic transmission 
The Renault 25's least durable part was the automatic transmission. As a result, most 25s remaining are the five-speed manual and few automatics have survived. Three automatic transmissions were used on R25: MJ3, 4141, both three-speed, and a new four-speed AR4, later used on the Renault Safrane as AD4/AD8. Due to the poor quality and design of the ATF cooler, especially on the later AR4, these versions have gained a poor reputation for reliability. A leaking ATF cooler could lead to gearbox failure with little or no physical warning, except for ATF stains beneath the vehicle to which not all drivers paid attention or not quickly enough.

The first transmissions started failing within a few years, while the model was still in production. Renault then prepared a package that was to replace the original poor-quality cooler regardless of vehicle age and mileage. However, the cooler location in front of the right wheel could not be changed. As a result, Renault 25 Automatics with the AR4 transmission are rare today.

Facelift 

The car underwent a facelift in June 1988, with a new front end, taillights, interior materials, and front suspension. Essentially, every panel was changed on the facelifted car, with the intent to smooth the styling. The new version also featured more powerful engines, the 2.2i engine being dropped and replaced by a 12v version of the 2.0i engine which produced .

Production ended in February 1992, to make way for the Renault Safrane.

Related models

Eagle Premier/Dodge Monaco 

The Renault 25 was the basis of the car platform for the Canadian-built full-sized Eagle Premier that was developed by American Motors Corporation (AMC) and introduced in 1988. 

The Premier featured exterior styling by Italdesign Giugiaro using the Renault 25 chassis, although the suspension was derived from the Eagle Medallion (Renault 21). The body was a true 4-door sedan with separate trunk lid, rather than a lift-up hatchback. The interior was designed by American Motors. 

When introduced, the car was branded as the Eagle Premier, subsequent to Renault selling its 47 percent stake in AMC to Chrysler in 1987. From 1990 to 1992, Chrysler also marketed a rebadged version as the Dodge Monaco.

Renault 25 Limousine 
An extended-wheelbase version of the initial Renault 25 was called the Renault 25 Limousine. It was  longer than the standard car and was available in two variants. The standard 25 Limousine had the same rear bench seat as the standard-wheelbase model whereas the Executive version had two individual seats with electric adjustment. The limousine (only available with the 2.7 L V6 for RHD markets) was dropped from the range of Renault UK, within two years of its introduction in 1985, but continued in other European markets.

Coachbuilders, such as Boonaker, provided bulletproof variants as well as fitting 2.5 L V6 Turbo engines. For a time, the President of France used an armored limousine variant of the Renault 25.

Trim levels 

French market specifications:

 Level 1: Power steering, front power windows, and sound system optional. No side body cladding or rear window wiper. Single beam headlights.
 Level 2: Power steering, front power windows, two-speaker stereo, side body cladding, and rear window wiper standard. 2 x 6 W sound system with steering wheel-mounted controls (specially designed by Philips for this model) optional.
 Level 3: Front and rear power windows, power mirrors, and 2 x 6 W Philips sound system standard. Trip computer and digital fuel gauge on gasoline versions. Anti-lock brakes, air conditioning, and 4 x 20 W Philips sound system with steering wheel-mounted controls optional.
 Level 4: 4 x 20 W Philips sound system and express up/down driver's power window standard. dual-beam headlights.
 Level 5: Air conditioning, leather interior, anti-lock brakes, seven-way power front seats, adjustable rear headrests, and elmwood inserts (door panels, gear shift knob) standard.
 Level 6: Automatic climate control, cruise control, voice synthesizer, inflatable cushions, memory seat, memory mirrors, power door locks, power trunk release, power trunk close, variable assistance (speed-sensitive) power steering, alarm.
 Level 7: Electronically controlled hydraulic system for Baccara models (Variable rate shock absorption suspension. This system can be used in one of two ways: sport or automatic. In automatic mode, the electronic module will control three shock absorption levels known as "comfort", "medium" and "sport" mode, which will be selected automatically in accordance with a strategy taking into account the parameters of vehicle speed, longitudinal acceleration, transverse acceleration, vertical acceleration and "stop" lights switch).

Engines 

(French-market specifications unless indicated otherwise. All hp metric.)

Petrol engines 

 2.0 L carbureted 8v I4  TS (1984–92, trim level 1) and GTS (1984–92, trim level 2). Top speed: 
 2.0 L fuel-injected 8v I4  (107 with catalytic converter on export versions) TX (1987–88, trim level 2; 1989–92, trim level 3) and TXE (1990–92, trim level 4) Top speed: 
 2.0 L fuel-injected 12v I4  TI (1991–92, trim level 3) and TXI (1990–92, trim level 4) Top speed: 
 2.2 L fuel-injected 8v I4 GTX (1984–89 on all markets, trim level 3; 1990–92 for export only, trim level 4) Top speed: 
 2.2 L fuel-injected 8v I4 GTX (1984–89 on all markets, trim level 3; 1990–92 for export only, trim level 4) Top speed: 
 2.7 L PRV fuel-injected 12v V6  V6 Injection (1984–88, trim level 4) Top speed: 
 2.9 L PRV fuel-injected 12v V6  ( with catalytic converter after 1990)  TX-V6 (1991–92, trim level 3), V6 Injection (1989–92, trim level 4), and Baccara (1989–92, trim level 5) Top speed: 
 2.9 L PRV fuel-injected 12v V6   TX-V6 (1991–92, trim level 3), V6 Injection (1989–92, trim level 4), and Baccara (1989–92, trim level 5) Top speed: 
 2.9 L PRV fuel-injected 12v V6   V6 Injection (1987–88) Top speed: 
 2.5 L PRV fuel-injected 12v V6 turbo  V6 Turbo (1985–90, trim level 4 with model-specific steering wheel, rims, colour-coded bumpers (not available on any other PH1 car) and grille until 1989). Top speed: 
 2.5 L PRV fuel-injected 12v V6 turbo   V6 Turbo (1990–92, trim level 4) and V6 Turbo Baccara (1990–92, trim level 5) Top speed: 
91 92 Txi 2,2 136BG 179

Diesel engines 

 2.1 L 8v I4  TD (1984–88, trim level 1) and GTD (1984–92, trim level 2) Top speed: 
 2.1 L 8v I4  Turbo-D (1984–92, trim level 3) and Turbo-DX (1984–92, trim level 4 except no express up/down driver window before 1989) Top speed:

Australia and the United Kingdom 
The 25 was also exported to Australia. Introduced in 1985, it was priced at A$35,000 without cruise control. It had a disc drum brake setup, rather than four-wheel discs as on the Renault 18.

The R25 was exported to the United Kingdom from the beginning of 1984, where its hatchback body style helped it to stand out compared with conventional saloons.

GTX in the United Kingdom was equivalent to Level 3 in the above list & used the 123 hp 2.2i engine. For the facelift versions the equivalent to the GTX was the TXI, with the 2.0 12v engine of 140 hp. The 12v head from the 2.0 engine was latterly used in the J7T 2.2i engine in Safrane. The 2.2 engines in the Safrane are effectively a long-stroke version of the 2.0 engine – which gave better torque but was less free-revving.

For the United Kingdom, the pre-facelift range included TS, Monaco (being a special edition with metallic brown paint, Monaco badging on the boot and C-Pillar insert panels, Leather interior, and some other changes from the TS spec), GTX, V6 & V6 Turbo.

The facelift cars were TX (2.0 12v/2.2i special order), TXI (2.0i 12v/2.2i special order), V6, V6 Turbo for a short period, and Baccara (2.9i V6/2.5i V6 Turbo) which was the top of the range. The 2.2i (123 hp) engine in the Phase 2 cars was only available 'while stocks last'. The lower compression 108 hp 2.2 was not sold in the United Kingdom.

References 

25
Executive cars
Hatchbacks
Front-wheel-drive vehicles
Cars introduced in 1983
1990s cars
Cars discontinued in 1992